Csilla Bartos-Cserepy (née Bartos; born 29 March 1966) is a retired professional tennis who represented Hungary and Switzerland.

Early life and tennis career
Csilla Bartos was born in Cairo, Egypt on 29 March 1966, daughter of Hungarian parents Gyozo, a business man, and Klára Killermann, an Olympic breaststroke swimmer. She lived in Nigeria for nine years during her childhood.

During her tennis career, Bartos-Cserepy reached two WTA singles finals. In 1986, she was runner-up to Nathalie Herreman in Perugia, losing the final is two sets, and in 1990, Sandra Cecchini defeated her in the final of the Tier V tournament in Båstad, Sweden, also in straight sets. In Perugia, she also reached the final of the doubles event, partnering Amy Holton, but lost to the Dutch team of Carin Bakkum and Nicole Muns-Jagerman.

Bartos-Cserepy's best singles performance at Grand Slam level was reaching the third round of the 1987 Australian Open where she lost in three sets to sixth-seeded Manuela Maleeva.

Bartos-Cserepy played in four editions of Federation Cup tennis for Hungary between 1981 and 1986. In 1990, she participated for Switzerland. She played a total of 17 ties and compiled a record of 17 wins and 13 losses.

In 1985, she married Danny Cserepy and played under the name Csilla Bartos-Cserepy or Csilla Cserepy. She is the aunt of Princess Viktória de Bourbon de Parme.

WTA Tour finals

Singles (0-2)

Doubles (0-2)

ITF Finals

Singles (5–2)

Doubles (1-1)

References

External links
 
 
 

1966 births
Living people
Csilla
Swiss female tennis players
Hungarian female tennis players
Sportspeople from Cairo
Swiss people of Hungarian descent
Hungarian expatriate sportspeople in Switzerland
Hungarian expatriates in Nigeria
Naturalised citizens of Switzerland